Left anterior fascicular block (LAFB) is an abnormal condition of the left ventricle of the heart, related to, but distinguished from, left bundle branch block (LBBB).

It is caused by only the left anterior fascicle – one half of the left bundle branch being defective. It is manifested on the ECG by left axis deviation. It is much more common than left posterior fascicular block.

Mechanism
Normal activation of the left ventricle (LV) proceeds down the left bundle branch, which consist of three fascicles, the left anterior fascicle, the left posterior fascicle, and the septal fascicle. The posterior fascicle supplies the posterior and inferoposterior walls of the LV, the anterior fascicle supplies the upper and anterior parts of the LV and the septal fascicle supplies the septal wall with innervation. LAFB — which is also known as left anterior hemiblock (LAHB) — occurs when a cardiac impulse spreads first through the left posterior fascicle, causing a delay in activation of the anterior and upper parts of the LV. Although there is a delay or block in activation of the left anterior fascicle there is still preservation of initial left to right septal activation as well as preservation of the inferior activation of the LV (preservation, on the EKG, of septal Q waves in I and aVL and predominantly negative QRS complex in leads II, III, and aVF). The delayed and unopposed activation of the remainder of the LV now results in a shift in the QRS axis leftward and superiorly, causing marked left axis deviation. This delayed activation also results in a widening of the QRS complex, although not to the extent of a complete LBBB.

Diagnosis
 Abnormal left axis deviation (usually between –45° and –60°)
 qR pattern (small q, tall R) in the lateral limb leads I and aVL
 rS pattern (small r, deep S) in the inferior leads II, III, and aVF
 Delayed intrinsicoid deflection in lead aVL (> 0.045 s)

LAFB cannot be diagnosed when a prior inferior wall myocardial infarction (IMI) is evident on the ECG.  IMI can also cause extreme left-axis deviation, but will manifest with Q-waves in the inferior leads II, III, and aVF.  By contrast, QRS complexes in the inferior leads should begin with r-waves in LAFB.

Effects of LAFB on Diagnosing Infarctions and Left Ventricular Hypertrophy
LAHB may be a cause of poor R wave progression across the precordium causing a pseudoinfarction pattern mimicking an anteroseptal infarction. It also makes the electrocardiographic diagnosis of LVH more complicated, because both may cause a large R wave in lead aVL.  Therefore, to call LVH on an EKG in the setting of an LAHB you should see the presence of a “strain pattern” when you are relying on limb lead criteria to diagnose LVH

Clinical significance
 It can be seen in approximately 4% of cases of acute myocardial infarction
 It is the most common type of intraventricular conduction defect seen in acute anterior myocardial infarction, and the left anterior descending artery is usually the culprit vessel.
 It can be seen with acute inferior wall myocardial infarction.
 It is also associated with hypertensive heart disease, aortic valvular disease, cardiomyopathies, and degenerative fibrotic disease of the cardiac skeleton.

See also
 Bundle branch block

References

External links 

Cardiogenetic disorders